José Rosa (born 6 July 1954) is a Puerto Rican boxer. He competed in the men's light heavyweight event at the 1976 Summer Olympics.

Professional career
Rosa did not enjoy success as a professional boxer: turning professional on October 24, 1973 with a six round draw (tie) against Frank Santore, Sr., who later became a referee, at the Orlando Sports Stadium in Orlando, Florida, Rosa only had nine bouts, winning 3, losing 5 and drawing 1, with 1 knockout win.

References

External links
 

1954 births
Living people
Puerto Rican male boxers
Olympic boxers of Puerto Rico
Boxers at the 1976 Summer Olympics
Place of birth missing (living people)
Light-heavyweight boxers